Garnet is a ghost town in Granite County, Montana, United States. Located on the dirt Garnet Range Road, it is an abandoned mining town that dates from the 1860s. In First Chance Gulch in western Montana, the town is located 11 miles up the Garnet Range Road, in mountains and forest. The town is at approximately  elevation.

The town was listed on the National Register of Historic Places as the Garnet Historic District, a historic district, in 2010.

Garnet, established in the 1890s, was the residential and commercial center for an area that was extensively mined between 1870 and 1920. The buildings are mostly at the north end of Last Chance Gulch, but the listing includes mining structures in a wider area extending in all directions from the town site.
 

In 2010, much of the area was owned by the U.S. Bureau of Land Management and was included in its Garnet Resource Area.

Architects/builders included Ole Dahl, who built Dahl Saloon (also known as Ole's and as "The Joint") and the Dahl House, Robert Moore who built Kelly's Saloon, Hugh Hannifen who built Hannifen House, Judson and Blaidsell who built the F.A. Davey Store, and John and Winifred Wells who built the Wells Hotel.

Garnet was originally named Mitchell in 1895  and had ten buildings. The main part of the town was built on the Garnet Lode. Later changing its name to Garnet, it was a rich gold mining area. In 1898, as many as 1,000 people lived here; it was abandoned 20 years later when the gold ran out. A fire in 1912 destroyed half the town, which was never rebuilt. Supplies needed in Garnet were generally obtained from nearby Bearmouth.

Despite this, Garnet is one of the state's best preserved ghost towns with 16,000 visitors annually. The annual celebration the third Saturday of each year is Garnet Day. Garnet's oldest living member, Mary Jane Adams Morin, came to visit every year.

Garnet has the Wells hotels, Kelly Saloon, Daveys Store and many outer buildings, preserved and intact. During the 1890s, it had close to thirteen saloons (bars), as well as food stores, a barber shop, mercantile store, and three hotels. The hotels were started for passersby, or people coming to pick up gold. Their rates typically ranged from $1–3, and the poor miners who could not afford that price could sleep in the attic without any windows for a quarter.

References

External links
 Garnet Montana Oral History Project (University of Montana Archives)
 Garnet Preservation Association Oral History Project (University of Montana Archives)
 Bureau of Land Management
 GarnetGhostTown.net
 Visit Montana.com
 Garnet- Montana's Best Kept Ghost Town Secret

Historic districts on the National Register of Historic Places in Montana
National Register of Historic Places in Granite County, Montana
Late 19th and Early 20th Century American Movements architecture
1895 establishments in Montana
Ghost towns in Montana
Geography of Granite County, Montana
Open-air museums in Montana
Populated places on the National Register of Historic Places in Montana